This is a list of schools provided by and within the City of Ballarat.

See also
Education in Ballarat

References 

Schools in Ballarat
Ballarat
Ballarat